The title King of the Britons was used (often retrospectively) to refer to the most powerful ruler among the Celtic Britons, both before and after the period of Roman Britain up until the Norman invasion of Wales and the Norman conquest of England. Britons were the Brittonic-speaking (ancestral language of Welsh) peoples of what is now Wales, England and southern Scotland. The Britons are the ethnic ancestors of the Welsh in addition to the Cornish and Bretons.

During the Norman and Plantagenet periods, only Wales (or parts thereof) remained under Brittonic rule in Britain and the term "Britons" (Brythoniaid, Britaniaid, Brutaniaid) was used in Britain to mean the Welsh people (Cymry in modern Welsh). This, and the diminishing power of the Welsh rulers relative to the Kings of England, is reflected in the gradual evolution of the titles by which these rulers were known from "King of the Britons" in the 11th century to "Prince of Wales" in the 13th.

List of the Kings of the Britons, Kings of Wales, Princes of Wales

Other uses

See also
Bretwalda
List of legendary kings of Britain
Pendragon

References

 
Celtic Britons
Britons, King of the
Britons, King of the
Britons, King of the